Glenn Miller Wise (born July 14, 1896, Wyocena, Wisconsin – died September 24, 1991, Madison, Wisconsin) was a secretary, statistician, and Republican politician, who served as Wisconsin's first female Secretary of State from 1955 to 1957.

Background 
She was born Glenn Miller on July 14, 1896, in Wyocena, and grew up in La Valle in Sauk County, daughter of country doctor W. J. Miller. She graduated from Reedsburg Area High School, then earned a B.A. at Milwaukee-Downer College in 1917, and an M.A. in economics at the University of Wisconsin in 1919.

Career 
She was employed as a secretary in the Department of Economics of UW for two years, then went into business as the organizer and director of the Employment Exchange of the Washington School for Secretaries in Washington, D.C., before taking employment as a statistician at the University of Wisconsin. She was active in the Republican Party, being a particularly avid supporter of Wendell Willkie.

Office 
Miller was appointed Secretary of State of Wisconsin by Governor Kohler on Jan. 3, 1955 to fill the vacancy caused by the death in office of Secretary of State Fred R. Zimmerman, becoming Wisconsin's first woman Secretary of State. Zimmerman's son, Robert C. Zimmerman defeated her in the 1956 Republican primary. Wise remained an active and steadfast Republican.

After office 
She had married John E. Wise Sr. in 1924; he later became chief electrical engineer for the State of Wisconsin, and died in 1968. Glenn Wise was active in the Presbyterian church and civic activities; when she died at the age of 95, she left behind one son (John Jr.), five grandchildren and six great-grandchildren.

References

External links

1896 births
1991 deaths
Lawrence University alumni
People from Wyocena, Wisconsin
Politicians from Madison, Wisconsin
People from Sauk County, Wisconsin
Secretaries of State of Wisconsin
University of Wisconsin–Madison alumni
Women in Wisconsin politics
Milwaukee-Downer College alumni
20th-century American politicians
20th-century American women politicians